Vincent Trapp (26 January 1861 – 21 October 1929) was an Australian cricketer. He played three first-class cricket matches for Victoria between 1881 and 1884.

See also
 List of Victoria first-class cricketers

References

External links
 

1861 births
1929 deaths
Australian cricketers
Victoria cricketers
Cricketers from Melbourne